Close to You is the second studio album from American hip hop artist Father MC, released on May 19, 1992 on Uptown Records.

The album peaked at number one hundred eighty-five on the Billboard 200 chart.

Release and reception

The album peaked at the hundred and eighty-fifth spot on the U.S. Billboard 200 and reached the thirty-fourth spot on the R&B Albums chart.

Alex Henderson of Allmusic gave the album a positive review, noting that the "release demonstrates that pop-rap can have integrity," and calling the work "a solid, enjoyable follow-up for the Queens native."

Track listing
All music by Mark Morales and Mark C. Rooney except where noted.

Chart history

Album

Singles

Personnel
Information taken from Allmusic.
art direction – Carol Friedman
assistant engineering – Jack Hersca
assistant mixing – Jack Hersca, John Kogan, Dann Wojnar
design – Primary
direction – Vartan
drum machine – Mark Morales
engineering – Edward "DJ Eddie F" Ferrell, Michael Fossenkemper, Mike Fronda, Dave Hall, Jack Hersca, Rod Hui, Mark Morales
executive production – Father MC, Andre Harrell, Steve Lucas
guitar – Henry Grate
mastering – Jose Rodriguez
mixing – David Dachinger, Edward "DJ Eddie F" Ferrell, Michael Fossenkemper, Dave Hall, Rod Hui, Mark Morales, Kevin Reynolds
photography – Carol Friedman
production – Sean "Puffy" Combs Edward "DJ Eddie F" Ferrell, Dave Hall, Nevelle Hodge, Mark Morales, Howie Tee
production coordination – Crystal Johnson
stylist – Ellen Silverstein
vocal arranging – Mark Morales
vocals (background) – Mary J. Blige, Kenny Greene, Cedric "K-Ci" Hailey, Joel "JoJo" Hailey, Brenda Reid, Terri Robinson, Jeff Sanders, Clinton Wike, Tiffany Wilson

Notes

External links
 
 Close to You at Discogs

1992 albums
Albums produced by Sean Combs
Albums produced by Eddie F
Father MC albums
Uptown Records albums